When Empires Burn is the fourth solo studio album by Bob Catley, released by Frontiers Records in 2003.

Track listing
All songs written by Paul Hodson.
 "The Torment" — 1:53
 "Children of the Circle" — 5:40
 "Gonna Live Forever" — 3:39
 "The Prophecy" — 6:36
 "I'll Be Your Fool" — 4:34
 "Every Beat of My Heart" — 5:36
 "When Empires Burn" — 5:33
 "Meaning of Love" — 4:49
 "This Is the Day" — 6:21
 "Someday Utopia" — 5:41
 "My America" — 7:08

Bonus Tracks on Digipack edition
<LI> "Heaven Can Wait" - 4:08
<LI> "When the Earth Lies Still" [Demo] - 4:07

Personnel
Bob Catley — Vocals
Paul Hodson — Vocals, Keyboards
Al Barrow — Bass
Vince O'Regan — Guitar
Jamie Little — Drums

Production
Written, Engineered and Produced by Paul Hodson
Mixing by Paul Hodson, Assisted by Bob Catley

References

External links
 Official Bob Catley website

Bob Catley albums
2001 albums
Frontiers Records albums